Hussa can refer to:
 Hussa Ahmad Al-Sudayri
 Fussa, Tokyo
 Hussa of Bernicia, a sixth-century Northumbrian king